Kulaszne  (Kuliashne) is a village in the administrative district of Gmina Komańcza, within Sanok County, in the Subcarpathian Voivodeship (province) of south-eastern Poland, close to the border with Slovakia.

The village has a population of 220.

The Kulaszne church was built in 1912 as a Greek Catholic - cerkiew. It burned down in 1974 and a Roman Catholic church was built over the
foundation. In 2004, the building reverted to Greek Catholic, so
it is now, once again - a cerkiew.

See also
Komancza Republic (November 1918 – January 1919)

References

Kulaszne